Associazione Sportiva Dilettantistica Sporting Terni was an Italian association football club, based in Terni, Umbria.

History 
The club was founded in 2009 after the merging of G.S. Arrone (that played Serie D in the 2008–09 season), Gabelletta and Nuova Virgilio Maroso. Arrone, Gabelletta and Virgilio Maroso were all refounded in the lower leagues.

It was relegated to Eccellenza at the end of the 2009–10 season and it has been called back to Serie D due to a large number of exclusions.

In summer 2013 the club wasn't able to enter 2013–14 Serie D and was so subsequently liquidated.

Colors and badge 
The team's colors were white, green and dark red.

Stadium 
It played its home matches at the Stadio Mirko Fabrizi.

External links 
Official homepage

Football clubs in Umbria
Terni
Association football clubs established in 2009
Association football clubs disestablished in 2013
2009 establishments in Italy
2013 disestablishments in Italy